EBBC may refer to:

 EBBC (Den Bosch), a Dutch basketball club
 East Bay Bicycle Coalition, a California advocacy group

See also 
 European Bird Census Council